Nemanja Vranješ (born May 11, 1988) is a Montenegrin professional basketball player currently playing for Mornar Bar of the Montenegrin League.

External links
Profile at aba-liga.com
Profile at eurobasket.com
Profile at fiba.com
Profile at kscg.me

1988 births
Living people
ABA League players
Greek Basket League players
KK Budućnost players
KK Mornar Bar players
KK Sutjeska players
OKK Borac players
Montenegrin expatriate basketball people in Greece
Montenegrin men's basketball players
Pagrati B.C. players
People from Sanski Most
Shooting guards